List of Washington-related topics may refer to:

 Outline of Washington (state)
 Outline of Washington, D.C.